Edward Greenwood (19 January 1845 – 25 January 1899) was an English cricketer who played in one first-class cricket match for Kent County Cricket Club in 1873.

Greenwood was born at St John's Wood in London, the son of John and Jane Greenwood. His father worked as a solicitor and Greenwood was wealthy enough to not need to work throughout his life. He lived at Hildenborough throughout most of his life and played cricket for local sides, including Tonbridge, Edenbridge and Tunbridge Wells. Greenwood made his only first-class appearance for Kent against Lancashire in 1873 at Gravesend, scoring 13 runs in his second innings after making a duck in the first.

Greenwood married Mary Hollingdale in 1886 but had no children. He died at Smithwood House near Cranleigh in Surrey in 1899 aged 54. The cause of death was recorded as alcoholism.

References

External links

1845 births
1899 deaths
People from St John's Wood
English cricketers
Kent cricketers
Alcohol-related deaths in England